The General Intelligence Agency of Mongolia (GIA; Mongolian language: Тагнуулын ерөнхий газар) is the intelligence agency of the Mongolian government, under the direct control of the Prime Minister of Mongolia. Its headquarters is in the Mongolian capital of Ulaanbaatar. The GIA employs several hundreds of people and acts as an early warning system to alert the Mongolian government of national security threats. It collects and evaluates information on a variety of areas such as international terrorism, organized crime, weapons and drug trafficking, money laundering, illegal migration and information warfare.

Naming lineage 

 Department of Homeland Security (1922-1933)
 General Department of Homeland Security (1933-1936)
 Ministry of the Interior (1936-1955)
 Ministry of Military and Social Security (1955-1959)
 Ministry of Social Security (1959-1990)
 General Department of State Security (1990-1994)
 Central Intelligence Agency (1994-1996)
 Department of State Security (1996-2000)
 General Intelligence Agency (since 2000)

History 
GIA began as the Internal Security Directorate (дотоодыг хамгаалах газар), which was established in 1922 under the leadership of director Dashin Baldandorzh. In 1936, it was reorganized as the National Security Directorate and in 1959, the renamed to the Ministry of Public Security of the Mongolian People's Republic. The Ministry of Public Security of the MPR was a catalyst for the republic's paramilitary forces, which totaled around 30,000 men by 1955. The GIA was founded from the MPS after the abolition of the socialist state in 1992.

List of directors 

 Dashin Baldandorzh (1922–1923)
 Konstantin Batorun (1923–1925)
 Nasanbat Navaandorzhiyn (1925–1926)
 Khayanhirva Namzhilin (1926–1928)
 Zolbinginy Shizhe (1928–1930)
 Bat-Ochiryn Eldev-Ochir (1930–1932)
 Davaagine Namsrai (1932–1936)
 Khorloogiin Choibalsan (1936–1940)
 Puravyn Dambadarzh (1940–1941)
 Bat Ochirin Shagdarzhav (1941–1946)
 Dashin Tsedev (1946–1949)
 Butamgein Duinharzhav (1949–1951)
 Damdinnerangiin Bath (1951–1952)
 Tsedengiin Zhanchiv (1952–1956)
 Batyn Dorzh (1956–1961)
 Tsevegiin Nansaljav (1961-1962)
 Budiin Banzaragch (1962-1963)
 Badrakhyn Jambalsuren (1963-1971)
 Bugiin Dejid (1971-1981)
 Ulziihutagtiin Choijilsuren (1981-1982)
 Sonomyn Luvsangombo (1982-1984)
 Agvaanjantsan Jamsranjav (1984-1990)
 Battsagaanii Tsiiregzen (1990.04.19-1990.10.19)
 Jaalkhuugiin Baatar (1990-1993), (1996.09.02-1996.12.05)
 Dalkhjavyn Sandag (1993-1996)
 Jamsrangiin Enkhnasan (1996-2001)
 Mandaakhuugiin Batsaikhan (2001-2004)
 B. Bilegt (until 2006)
 Navaansurengin Gunbold (2006–2007) 
 Ravdangiin Bold (2007–2012) 
 D. Gerel (2012–2013)
 B. Ariunsan (2013–2014)
 Bat Khurts (2014–2017)
 D. Gerel (since 2017-2020)
 Peljee Odonbaatar (since 2020)

External links
Official website

References

Intelligence agencies
Government of Mongolia